Porgy and Bess is a studio album by jazz vocalist and trumpeter Louis Armstrong and singer Ella Fitzgerald, released on Verve Records in 1959. The third and final of the pair's albums for the label, it is a suite of selections from the George Gershwin opera Porgy and Bess. Orchestral arrangements are by Russell Garcia, who had previously arranged the 1956 jazz vocal recording The Complete Porgy and Bess.

Background
In 1959, a big-budget film version produced by Samuel Goldwyn and directed by Otto Preminger arrived in theaters. To coincide with the film, many jazz and vocal versions of the work were produced on records, this one and the celebrated Miles Davis and Gil Evans collaboration among them. The double album was released in both mono and stereo, and on compact disc in 1990. It is also part of the set The Complete Ella Fitzgerald & Louis Armstrong on Verve issued in 1997. Given the nature of the work, only five tracks feature vocals by both Armstrong and Fitzgerald.

Reception
In 2001, it was awarded a Grammy Hall of Fame Award, a special achievement prize established in 1973 to honor recordings that are at least twenty-five years old, and that have "qualitative or historical significance." The album is considered the most musically successful amongst the jazz vocal versions of the opera.

The AllMusic review of the album claimed "What's really great about the Ella and Louis version is Ella, who handles each aria with disarming delicacy, clarion intensity, or usually a blend of both... Pops sounds like he really savored each duet, and his trumpet work – not a whole lot of it, because this is not a trumpeter's opera – is characteristically good as gold. This marvelous album stands quite well on its own, but will sound best when matched with the Ray Charles/Cleo Laine version, especially the songs of the Crab Man, of Peter the Honey Man, and his wife, Lily the Strawberry Woman."

Track listing
All music written by George Gershwin; all lyrics by Ira Gershwin and DuBose Heyward except where noted.

Side one

Side two

Side three

Side four

Personnel
Ella Fitzgerald — vocals
Louis Armstrong — vocals; trumpet on "Summertime," "I Got Plenty o' Nuttin'," "It Ain't Necessarily So," "A Woman Is a Sometime Thing," and "There's a Boat Dat's Leavin' Soon for New York"

Orchestra
Russell Garcia – arranger, conductor
Victor Arno, Robert Barene, Jacques Gasselin, Joseph Livoti, Dan Lube, Amerigo Marino, Erno Neufeld, Marshall Sosson, Robert Sushel, Gerald Vinci, Tibor Zelig — violins
Myron Bacon, Abraham Hochstein, Raymond Menhennick, Myron Sandler — violas
Justin Di Tullio, Kurt Reher, William Van Den Burg — cellos
Frank Beach, Buddy Childers, Cappy Lewis — trumpets
Milt Bernhart, Marshall Cram, James Henderson, Lloyd Ulyate — trombones
Vincent DeRosa – French horn
Bill Miller, Paul Smith – piano
Tony Rizzi – guitar
Joe Mondragon – double bass
Alvin Stoller – drums

References

External links
Notes on August 18-19 1957 session and October 14 1957 session from the Jazz Discography Project

1959 albums
Ella Fitzgerald albums
Louis Armstrong albums
Verve Records albums
Vocal duet albums
Albums arranged by Russell Garcia (composer)
Albums produced by Norman Granz
Grammy Hall of Fame Award recipients
Albums conducted by Russell Garcia (composer)
Ella Fitzgerald and Louis Armstrong album